Christian Cyrus Leben (born July 21, 1980) is an American former mixed martial artist, referee, and bare knuckle boxer. A professional MMA competitor from 2002 until 2013, he most notably competed in the UFC in the Middleweight division, compiling a record of 12–10 in 22 appearances for the organization. Leben first appeared in the inaugural season of The Ultimate Fighter reality series, and also fought in the now-defunct WEC. He began his UFC career with five victories in a row before suffering a knockout loss to future UFC Middleweight Champion Anderson Silva, and was known for his toughness and powerful left hand. Leben was the inaugural WEC Middleweight Champion.

Background
Leben is from Portland, Oregon and has one older brother and one younger sister. He grew up without his father around, and he did not even meet his father until he was 23 years old. Because of this, Leben's mother worked hard for many hours daily as a bartender so that she could support the family. Growing up Leben enjoyed skateboarding, dirt biking, and snowboarding. When he was in middle school, he began watching the UFC and became very interested in MMA. He began training in boxing, and then was on the wrestling team at Benson Polytechnic High School, picking up the sport rather quickly. Leben did not receive a very good education in his childhood, and did not know how to read or write even after graduating high school. Leben soon joined the United States Army, falsely being told by the recruiter that he would be allowed to wrestle for the army's team. When he found that he would not be allowed to wrestle for the army, Leben went AWOL and was discharged.

Mixed martial arts

Early career
While visiting his brother at work one day, Leben noticed an MMA gym located across the street, home to Team Quest. Trainer Robert Follis accepted Leben into the team, and soon Leben was training with Randy Couture, Matt Lindland, Nate Quarry, and Ed Herman. After refining his talent, Leben began fighting as an amateur, achieving a record of 5–0, and capturing the FCFF and UFCF middleweight titles.

After his success in the amateur ranks where he went 4–0, Leben turned professional. He won his first five fights, three of them by knockout, and in the process won the Gladiator Challenge, Sportfight, and WEC Middleweight titles. Leben achieved wins against Benji Radach and Mike Swick, but suffered a decision loss to Joe Doerksen.

The Ultimate Fighter
Leben was one of the most controversial and outspoken fighters on The Ultimate Fighter 1 due to his variously abrasive and melancholy personality.  In the first episode, while intoxicated, he urinated on future teammate Jason Thacker's bed, and stole his pillow. One night when everyone in the household was drinking, Leben challenged Bobby Southworth to fight who then called Leben a "fatherless bastard" on account of Leben's father being absent during his childhood, requiring Leben being physically restrained from accosting Southworth. Leben then began sobbing and proceeded to sleep outside. After a heated confrontation precipitated by Josh Koscheck and Southworth spraying a sleeping Leben with a hose, Leben broke a door with his fist. After the confrontation, UFC president Dana White set up a match between Leben and Koscheck, which Leben lost by unanimous decision due to Koscheck's ability to score points by controlling Leben on the ground.

Later in the show, teammate Nate Quarry was eliminated from the competition due to an ankle injury and was able to choose a previously eliminated fighter to replace him. He chose Leben, who was later defeated by Kenny Florian due to doctor stoppage in the first semi-final match after Florian opened a cut above Leben's eye with an elbow strike. His losses on the show are not on his professional record, as the fights were classified by Nevada as exhibition bouts due to the decisions of the bouts not being disclosed until the fights aired on the show rather than being posted immediately following the fights.

Ultimate Fighting Championship
On April 9, 2005, Leben fought Jason Thacker on the undercard of the live finale of The Ultimate Fighter 1. Thacker was not amused when he watched the show and found out Leben had used his bed as a urinal. Speaking with Dana White, Thacker demanded a match against Leben at the finale. The match was set up, and Leben won 95 seconds into the first round after referee stoppage due to strikes. Afterward, Leben apologized to Thacker for urinating on his bed, saying he had since given up drinking because of that sort of incident.

After the show, Leben moved to Seattle, Washington, to train with AMC Pankration. He has competed in several UFC events since the show and is the only person to have fought in the first six Ultimate Fight Night events, during which he earned a string of victories: a split decision win over future TUF 4 finalist Patrick Côté, an armbar submission against Edwin Dewees, a first-round TKO over Jorge Rivera, and a unanimous decision over Luigi Fioravanti. Leben was defeated by Anderson Silva at UFC Ultimate Fight Night 5 on June 28, 2006, by KO 49 seconds into the first round, but returned at UFC Fight Night 6 on August 17, 2006, where he defeated Jorge Santiago by knockout 35 seconds into the second round. He is the only fighter to fight at every event under the "Fight Night" banner.

Leben then lost at UFC 66 to longtime UFC veteran Jason MacDonald via technical submission due to a modified guillotine choke with less than a minute remaining in the second round.

Leben then lost to Kalib Starnes by a very close unanimous decision at UFC 71 on May 26, 2007. The bout won Fight of the Night honors.

It was reported that Leben was offered a main event fight against Mike Swick at UFC Fight Night 11, but turned down the fight for unknown reasons; it was later revealed on the Ultimate Fighter Season 1 reunion show by UFC President Dana White's call to matchmaker Joe Silva that Leben's camp turned down the fight and that Leben himself had no prior knowledge of the fight offer. Leben instead took on Terry Martin on the same UFC Fight Night 11 card. Even after being rocked with multiple punches by Martin, a half-dazed Leben defeated Martin by knockout at 3:56 of the third round.

At UFC 82, he knocked out Italian Alessio Sakara in the first round, winning the Knockout of the Night award.

On April 30, 2008, Leben was arrested in Oregon by Clackamas County Sheriffs for a DUI stemming from an earlier date. He was kept in jail and temporarily held without bond for allegedly violating his probation. Leben was then sentenced to 35 days in jail.

His next fight was against Michael Bisping at UFC 89, which he lost by a unanimous decision after a full three rounds. Leben taunted Bisping throughout the last two rounds by dropping his arms and raising his chin. The judges scored the fight 30–27 (twice) and 29–28 for Bisping. Bisping used effective counter punching in the fight to keep the aggressive Leben at bay. Both fighters showed sportsmanship by congratulating one another and raising each other's arm after the fight.
After the fight with Bisping, Leben tested positive for Stanozolol and was suspended for nine months and fined a third of his fight purse. He was eligible to return in July 2009. Leben admitted he had used the substance several months prior to the fight, but stated he had assumed it would have been out of his system by then.

Leben then fought Jake Rosholt at UFC 102 in Leben's hometown of Portland, Oregon. In the third round, he was rendered unconscious via an arm triangle choke, losing the fight by submission.

Leben then faced Jay Silva on January 11, 2010, at UFC Fight Night 20, winning via unanimous decision (30–27, 30–27, 30–27).

Leben was expected to face Aaron Simpson at UFC 114, but the bout took place on June 19, 2010, at The Ultimate Fighter: Team Liddell vs. Team Ortiz Finale. After a rough first round where Simpson slammed Leben a couple of times, Leben eventually connected consecutive punches on Simpson in the second that sent him stumbling across the octagon, collapsing face first at the other side of the octagon, prompting referee Josh Rosenthal to end the fight via TKO at 4:17 of the second round.

After Wanderlei Silva was forced out of his UFC 116 bout with Yoshihiro Akiyama due to broken ribs, Leben agreed to fill in for Silva in the bout against Akiyama, and faced him two weeks after defeating Simpson. Although he was outstruck and outwrestled for most of the first round, Leben managed to stay competitive and keep a fast paced fight with the rapidly tiring Akiyama in the second round. In the third and final round, Leben capitalized and sunk in a triangle choke with just twenty seconds left in the fight, forcing Akiyama to submit. It was considered the best performance of Leben's career and one of the best fights of the year. After the fight, Leben called for a fight with Silva, saying "come on Wanderlei, I'll take you out, too!", though UFC president Dana White said in the post-fight press conference that a Leben-Silva affair is not under consideration. Leben won Sherdog.com's Comeback Fighter of the Year for 2010.

On October 20, 2010, Leben was arrested in Honolulu, Hawaii for suspicion of driving under the influence after crashing his truck into a wall off of Kapiolani Boulevard. He was released from custody after posting bail.

Leben faced Brian Stann on January 1, 2011, at UFC 125 He lost the fight via TKO in the first round. After the fight between Leben and Stann, Leben's coach Burton Richardson says Leben's poor performance may have been caused by a sickness before the bout: "First, great job by Brian Stann. He never looked better. Many have commented that Chris was very slow and looked off last night. The truth is that Chris was sick. He had a fever and chills when he stepped into the cage. He was vomiting in the locker room before the fight, and after a hard warm up he didn't have a drop of sweat. Big heart to fight like that, but he was moving slow motion. He was very sharp in training. He will be back."

On April 4, 2011, the UFC announced that Leben's next opponent would be Wanderlei Silva with the two scheduled to meet on July 2, 2011, at UFC 132. Leben knocked out Silva with consecutive uppercuts from the clinch, 27 seconds into the fight, resulting in the fastest knockout win in Leben's career.

Leben faced Mark Muñoz on November 5, 2011, at UFC 138, losing by TKO at the 5:00 mark of the 2nd round due to a cut on his left eyebrow and left him unable to see and forced a corner stoppage.  On November 28, 2011, Zuffa LLC, owner of the Ultimate Fighting Championship, released information stating that Leben tested positive for oxycodone and oxymorphone following his loss to Muñoz at UFC 138. As a result of the positive test, Leben was suspended from fighting for 1 year.

Leben's return fight was expected to be against Karlos Vemola on December 29, 2012, at UFC 155.  However, Vemola was forced out of the bout and replaced by promotional newcomer Derek Brunson. Leben was defeated via unanimous decision.

Leben fought Andrew Craig and lost by split decision on July 6, 2013, at UFC 162.

Leben faced Uriah Hall on December 28, 2013, at UFC 168. After almost being knocked out at the end of the first round, Leben told his corner that he was done, taking a TKO loss to Hall after the first round.  UFC commentator Joe Rogan pointed out during the broadcast that Leben asked, "Was I knocked out?" as he was being led to his corner.  Leben then reiterated "I'm done" multiple times before the fight was waved off. This marked Leben's fourth loss in a row.

Retirement
On January 20, 2014, Leben announced his retirement from MMA competition. He will continue his martial arts legacy by focusing on coaching his students and pro fighters at his new MMA gym "The Training Center" in San Diego, California. He cited an increasingly talented middleweight roster, his recent losing streak and the risk of serious injury as reasons for retiring. He called himself fortunate to have never had surgery throughout his record 22-fight middleweight stint, though he predicted several of his nagging injuries will get worse with time.

On February 5, 2021, after his first round knockout win over Quentin Henry in the Bare Knuckle Fighting Championship, Leben announced his official retirement from combat sports.

Bellator MMA
After two years away from active competition for Leben, it was announced by Scott Coker on Inside MMA that Leben had signed a multi-fight deal with Bellator MMA in February 2016. However, after undergoing a physical to be cleared, he failed several electrocardiogram (EKG) tests, according to the statement. Doctors discovered a "life-threatening abnormality" to the left ventricle of his heart, which was "oversized", "misshapen", and "not operating properly," thus ending any possibility of a return.

Unretirement
In late 2018 Chris came out of retirement after being given an all-clear by doctors.

Bare knuckle boxing

World Bare Knuckle Fighting Federation
After a return to MMA never materialized, Leben instead turned to bare knuckle boxing. He faced Phil Baroni at the World Bare Knuckle Fighting Federation debut card on November 9, 2018. He won the fight via TKO in the first round. In March 2019, reports surfaced that Leben had sued WBKFF for $90,000 in unpaid salary.

Bare Knuckle Fighting Championship
Leben made his debut for Bare Knuckle Fighting Championship on April 6, 2019. He faced Justin Baesman in the show's co-main event. Leben won the fight via knockout just 25 seconds into the first round.

Leben was supposed to face Brennan Ward at BKFC 6 on June 22, 2019. On June 12, news surfaced that Ward withdrew from the bout and was replaced by Dakota Cochrane. Leben lost the fight by unanimous decision.

Leben faced Quentin Henry at BKFC: Knucklemania on February 5, 2021. He won the fight via knockout in the first round and subsequently announced his retirement from combat sports.

Personal life
In May 2007, Leben moved to East Oahu, Hawaii to accept the main coaching job at Icon Fitness MMA Gym. In addition to training at ICON, Leben and fighter Steven "The Soul Samurai" Saito opened Ultimate Fight School gym in Oahu in January, located two blocks from the University of Hawaii campus. Leben is a playable fighter in the UFC Undisputed video games. Before becoming a professional fighter, Leben worked construction and was a housepainter. Leben has a radio show called "Unfiltered MMA Radio".

In 2016, Leben completed Herb Dean's mixed martial arts referee course, making him eligible to referee bouts in California. After refereeing in the regional circuit, Leben debuted in notable shows at Golden Boy Promotions: Liddell vs. Ortiz 3.

Having well-documented past with substance abuse, Leben claims to be sober since 2015 and is actively advocating for clean eating and healthy lifestyle.

In February 2022, Leben was hospitalized for breathing issues after contracting COVID-19.

Legal issues
In October 2010, Leben was arrested in Honolulu on suspicion of driving under the influence after crashing his pick-up truck near the Kapiolani Boulevard exit on Interstate H-1. He was later released on $1,000 bail.

In June 2015, Leben was arrested on multiple charges after breaking into his ex-wife's San Diego, California, apartment. Charges included felony possession of a weapon and 11 counts of disobeying a court order after violating a restraining order his ex-wife had filed against him. When police arrived to the apartment, they found a .45 caliber pistol on a bed that belonged to Leben. In August, Leben pleaded guilty to the felony weapons charge and to the misdemeanor charges of vandalism and violating a restraining order. He was sentenced to serve 120 days in jail and three years of probation after release.

Championships and accomplishments

Mixed martial arts
Ultimate Fighting Championship
 The Ultimate Fighter Season 1 Semi-Finalist
Knockout of the Night (Four times) vs. Jorge Santiago, Terry Martin, Alessio Sakara, Aaron Simpson 
Fight of the Night (Two times) vs. Kalib Starnes, Yoshihiro Akiyama 
 All-time leader in UFC Middleweight fights (22)
 Fought in the First 5 Round Non-Title Main Event in UFC history
World Extreme Cagefighting
WEC Middleweight Championship (One time, first)
Gladiator Challenge
GC Middleweight Championship (One time)
Sherdog and MMANews247.com
 2010 Comeback Fighter of the Year
Amateur  titles
FCFF Middleweight Championship (One time)
UFCF Middleweight Championship (One time)

Mixed martial arts record

| Loss
| align=center| 22–12
| Uriah Hall
| TKO (retirement)
| UFC 168
| 
| align=center| 1
| align=center| 5:00
| Las Vegas, Nevada, United States
| 
|-
| Loss
| align=center| 22–11
| Andrew Craig
| Decision (split)
| UFC 162
| 
| align=center| 3
| align=center| 5:00
| Las Vegas, Nevada, United States
| 
|-
| Loss
| align=center| 22–10
| Derek Brunson
| Decision (unanimous)
| UFC 155
| 
| align=center| 3
| align=center| 5:00
| Las Vegas, Nevada, United States
| 
|-
| Loss
| align=center| 22–9
| Mark Muñoz
| TKO (corner stoppage)
| UFC 138
| 
| align=center| 2
| align=center| 5:00
| Birmingham, England, United Kingdom
| 
|-
| Win
| align=center| 22–8
| Wanderlei Silva
| KO (punches)
| UFC 132
| 
| align=center| 1
| align=center| 0:27
| Las Vegas, Nevada, United States
| 
|-
|  Loss
| align=center| 21–8
| Brian Stann
| TKO (knee and punches)
| UFC 125
| 
| align=center| 1
| align=center| 3:37
| Las Vegas, Nevada, United States
| 
|-
|  Win
| align=center| 21–7
| Yoshihiro Akiyama
| Submission (triangle choke)
| UFC 116
| 
| align=center| 3
| align=center| 4:40
| Las Vegas, Nevada, United States
| 
|-
| Win
| align=center| 20–7
| Aaron Simpson
| TKO (punches)
| The Ultimate Fighter 11 Finale
| 
| align=center| 2
| align=center| 4:17
| Las Vegas, Nevada, United States
| 
|-
| Win
| align=center| 19–7
| Jay Silva
| Decision (unanimous)
| UFC Fight Night: Maynard vs. Diaz
| 
| align=center| 3
| align=center| 5:00
| Fairfax, Virginia, United States
| 
|-
| Loss
| align=center| 18–7
| Jake Rosholt
| Technical Submission (arm-triangle choke)
| UFC 102
| 
| align=center| 3
| align=center| 1:30
| Portland, Oregon, United States
| 
|-
| Loss
| align=center| 18–6
| Michael Bisping
| Decision (unanimous)
| UFC 89
| 
| align=center| 3
| align=center| 5:00
| Birmingham, England, United Kingdom
| 
|-
| Win
| align=center| 18–5
| Alessio Sakara
| KO (punches)
| UFC 82
| 
| align=center| 1
| align=center| 3:16
| Columbus, Ohio, United States
| 
|-
| Win
| align=center| 17–5
| Terry Martin
| KO (punch)
| UFC Fight Night: Thomas vs. Florian
| 
| align=center| 3
| align=center| 3:56
| Las Vegas, Nevada, United States
| 
|-
| Loss
| align=center| 16–5
| Kalib Starnes
| Decision (unanimous)
| UFC 71
| 
| align=center| 3
| align=center| 5:00
| Las Vegas, Nevada, United States
| 
|-
| Loss
| align=center| 16–4
| Jason MacDonald
| Submission (guillotine choke)
| UFC 66
| 
| align=center| 2
| align=center| 4:03
| Las Vegas, Nevada, United States
| 
|-
| Win
| align=center| 16–3
| Jorge Santiago
| KO (punch)
| UFC Fight Night 6
| 
| align=center| 2
| align=center| 0:35
| Las Vegas, Nevada, United States
| 
|-
| Loss
| align=center| 15–3
| Anderson Silva
| KO (knee)
| UFC Fight Night 5
| 
| align=center| 1
| align=center| 0:49
| Las Vegas, Nevada, United States
| 
|-
| Win
| align=center| 15–2
| Luigi Fioravanti
| Decision (unanimous)
| UFC Fight Night 4
| 
| align=center| 3
| align=center| 5:00
| Las Vegas, Nevada, United States
| 
|-
| Win
| align=center| 14–2
| Jorge Rivera
| TKO (punches)
| UFC Fight Night 3
| 
| align=center| 1
| align=center| 1:44
| Las Vegas, Nevada, United States
| 
|-
| Win
| align=center| 13–2
| Edwin Dewees
| Submission (armbar)
| UFC Fight Night 2
| 
| align=center| 1
| align=center| 3:26
| Las Vegas, Nevada, United States
| 
|-
| Win
| align=center| 12–2
| Patrick Côté
| Decision (split)
| UFC Ultimate Fight Night
| 
| align=center| 3
| align=center| 5:00
| Las Vegas, Nevada, United States
| 
|-
| Win
| align=center| 11–2
| Jason Thacker
| TKO (punches)
| The Ultimate Fighter 1 Finale
| 
| align=center| 1
| align=center| 1:35
| Las Vegas, Nevada, United States
| 
|-
| Win
| align=center| 10–2
| Benji Radach
| TKO (broken jaw)
| SF 4: Fight For Freedom
| 
| align=center| 3
| align=center| 3:43
| Gresham, Oregon, United States
| 
|-
| Loss
| align=center| 9–2
| Joe Doerksen
| Decision (unanimous)
| Freestyle Fighting Championships 9
| 
| align=center| 3
| align=center| 5:00
| Biloxi, Mississippi, United States
| 
|-
| Win
| align=center| 9–1
| Justin Davis
| KO (punch)
| SF 3: Dome
| 
| align=center| 1
| align=center| 1:54
| Gresham, Oregon, United States
| 
|-
| Win
| align=center| 8–1
| Boyd Ballard
| KO (punches)
| UFCF: Night of Champions
| 
| align=center| 1
| align=center| 1:50
| Lynnwood, Washington, United States
| 
|-
| Win
| align=center| 7–1
| Mike Swick
| KO (punch)
| WEC 9
| 
| align=center| 2
| align=center| 0:45
| Lemoore, California, United States
| 
|-
| Win
| align=center| 6–1
| James Fanshier
| Decision (unanimous)
| Gladiator Challenge 20
| 
| align=center| 3
| align=center| 5:00
| Colusa, California, United States
| 
|-
| Win
| align=center| 5–1
| Brian Sleeman
| Submission (armbar)
| WEC 8
| 
| align=center| 1
| align=center| 3:15
| Lemoore, California, United States
| 
|-
| Win
| align=center| 4–1
| Boyd Ballard
| Submission (armbar)
| UFCF: Night of Champions
| 
| align=center| 1
| align=center| 2:18
| Lynnwood, Washington, United States
| 
|-
| Win
| align=center| 3–1
| Landon Showalter
| Decision (unanimous)
| TQP: Sport Fight "Second Coming"
| 
| align=center| 3
| align=center| 5:00
| Gresham, Oregon, United States
| 
|-
| Win
| align=center| 2–1
| Otto Olson
| KO (punch)
| UFCF: Battle in Seattle
| 
| align=center| 1
| align=center| 2:01
| Seattle, Washington, United States
|
|-
| Loss
| align=center| 1–1
| Paulo Gazze
| Decision
| HFP: Hitman Fight Productions 3
| 
| align=center| 3
| align=center| 5:00
| Santa Ana, California, United States
|
|-
| Win
| align=center| 1–0
| Bryce Hamilton
| Submission (armbar)
| UFCF: Everett Extreme Challenge 6
| 
| align=center| 1
| align=center| 2:45
| Everett, Washington, United States
|

Bareknuckle boxing record

|-
|Win
|align=center|3–1
|Quentin Henry
|KO (punch)
|BKFC KnuckleMania
|
|align=center|1
|align=center|1:07
|Miami, Florida, United States
|
|-
|Loss
|align=center|2–1
|Dakota Cochrane
|Decision (unanimous)
|Bare Knuckle FC 6
|
|align=center|5
|align=center|2:00
|Tampa, Florida, United States 
|
|-
|Win
|align=center|2–0
|Justin Baesman
|KO (punches)
|Bare Knuckle FC 5
|
|align=center|1
|align=center|0:25
|Biloxi, Mississippi, United States
|
|-
|Win
|align=center|1–0
|Phil Baroni
|TKO (punch)
|World Bare Knuckle Fighting Federation
|
|align=center|1
|align=center|1:19
|Casper, Wyoming, United States
|
|-

See also
 List of current UFC fighters
 List of male mixed martial artists
 List of World Extreme Cagefighting champions

Notes and references

External links
The Arena - Coaches Profile

Official UFC Profile

 Chris Leben arrested for DUI

1980 births
American male mixed martial artists
American sportspeople in doping cases
Mixed martial artists from Oregon
Middleweight mixed martial artists
Mixed martial artists utilizing boxing
Mixed martial artists utilizing wrestling
Mixed martial artists utilizing Brazilian jiu-jitsu
Bare-knuckle boxers 
Living people
American practitioners of Brazilian jiu-jitsu
Sportspeople from Portland, Oregon
Doping cases in mixed martial arts
Boxers from Portland, Oregon
Ultimate Fighting Championship male fighters
World Extreme Cagefighting champions